State Road 169 (NM 169) is a  state highway in the US state of New Mexico. NM 169's southern terminus is at U.S. Route 60 (US 60) in Magdalena, and the northern terminus is at the end of state maintenance east of Alamo.

Major intersections

See also

References

169
Transportation in Socorro County, New Mexico